Viscount Wolverhampton, of Wolverhampton in the County of Stafford, was a title in the Peerage of the United Kingdom. It was created on 4 May 1908 for the Liberal politician Henry Fowler. The title became extinct on the death of his son, the second Viscount, on 9 March 1943.

Ellen Thorneycroft Fowler and Edith Henrietta Fowler, daughters of the first Viscount, were both authors.

Viscounts Wolverhampton (1908)
Henry Hartley Fowler, 1st Viscount Wolverhampton (1830–1911)
Henry Ernest Fowler, 2nd Viscount Wolverhampton (1870–1943)

Arms

References

Extinct viscountcies in the Peerage of the United Kingdom
Noble titles created in 1908
Noble titles created for UK MPs